Fukinuki yatai (吹抜屋台) describes a feature of Japanese art particularly associated with e-maki (絵巻) painted scrolls, famously for example, yamato-e.

Literally meaning "blown off roof", fukinuki yatai relates to the depiction of both interior and exterior environments - including rooms, screens, and architecture where the roof and walls are removed and the beams are preserved. The basic visual feature depicts the interior scene from an upper diagonal with the roof, ceiling, and sometimes inner partitions removed. From an artistic perspective, it also importantly describes the composition by which character relations, or even feelings, are depicted in the layout.

This technique was used in early Japanese Heian period (平安時代) scrolls with very few exceptions until realism in Kamakura period (鎌倉) art flourished. The rudimentary function of fukinuki yatai was to portrait multiple narrative stories on the same painting using different spaces. The earliest usage of fukinuki yatai was found in the biography of Prince Shōtoku (聖徳太子絵伝). Other typical examples are found in The Tale of Genji (源氏物語絵巻), Murasaki Shikibu Diary Emaki (紫式部日記絵巻), and Kasuga Gongen Genki E (春日権現験記絵巻).

References

Emakimono